Kewin Oliveira Silva (born 25 January 1995), known simply as Kewin, is a Brazilian professional footballer who plays as a goalkeeper for Portuguese club Moreirense.

Professional career
Kewin began his footballing career as a backup goalkeeper with Red Bull Brasil. Kewin made his professional debut with Red Bull Bragantino in a 1-0 Campeonato Brasileiro Série B loss to Coritiba on 24 November 2019. In 2020 he signed with Mirassol, and in July of that year was loaned to Moreirense in the Primeira Liga.

External links

ADM Esporte Profile

References

1995 births
Footballers from São Paulo
Living people
Brazilian footballers
Association football goalkeepers
Red Bull Brasil players
América Futebol Clube (SP) players
Boa Esporte Clube players
Mirassol Futebol Clube players
Red Bull Bragantino players
Moreirense F.C. players
Campeonato Brasileiro Série B players
Primeira Liga players
Liga Portugal 2 players
Brazilian expatriate footballers
Brazilian expatriate sportspeople in Portugal
Expatriate footballers in Portugal